Robin Anderson (1950 – 2002) was an Australian award-winning documentary filmmaker.

Career
Anderson was in born in Perth, Western Australia in 1950. After graduating from high school in 1967 she spent a year in Europe including 6 months in Paris. Back in Australia she studied economics at the University of Western Australia and graduated three years later with honors and a federal government scholarship to study for master's degree in sociology at the Columbia University in New York City. There she studied under Herbert J. Gans and during her time in New York she developed a greater interest in cinema and ultimately decided to become a filmmaker.

Anderson returned to Australia after the graduating from Columbia and started to work for the Australia broadcaster ABC. Through her work at ABC she met the documentary filmmaker Bob Connolly, who soon became her husband and the father of her two future daughters. Together with her husband she produced five extensively researched documentaries set in Papua New Guinea and Australia, which were positively received and garnered several awards.

Their first documentary First Contact about the Australian Leahy brothers and their relation to natives of the remote highlands of Papua New Guinea was nominated for an Academy Award in the category Best Documentary Feature in 1984.

Anderson died of a rare form of cancer on 8 March 2002, aged 51 in Sydney. The following day her work appeared at the Sydney Film Festival.

Filmography
1982: First Contact
1989: Joe Leahy's Neighbours 
1992: Black Harvest
1996: Rats in the Ranks
2001: Facing the Music

Notes

References
John Phillips: Robin Anderson, 51, Creator Of Documentaries on Australia. The New York Times, 23 March 2002
Robin Hughes: Robin Anderson – A Tribute. Sense of Cinema, May 2002
Ian Aitken: Encyclopedia of the Documentary Film. Routledge, 2013, pp. 60-61
Richard Philipps: Leading Australian documentary filmmaker dies at wsws.org on 18 March 2002
 Brian McFarlane (ed.), Geoff Mayer (ed.), Ina Bertrand (ed.): The Oxford Companion to Australian Film. Oxford University Press, 1999, p. 13

External links 
 
http://www.der.org/films/filmmakers/robin-anderson.html

Australian film directors
Australian women film directors
1950 births
2002 deaths